Terry L. Austin (born October 16, 1955) is an American politician from Virginia. A member of the Republican Party, Austin is a member of the Virginia House of Delegates representing the 19th district. He previously served on the Botetourt County Board of Supervisors.

In 2022, Austin was promoted to chair of the Transportation Committee.

References

External links
 

1955 births
County supervisors in Virginia
Republican Party members of the Virginia House of Delegates
People from Botetourt County, Virginia
Place of birth missing (living people)
Living people
Politicians from Roanoke, Virginia
Businesspeople from Virginia
20th-century American businesspeople
21st-century American businesspeople
21st-century American politicians